A three-part constitutional referendum was held in the Northern Mariana Islands on 1 November 1997. All three proposals were approved by voters.

Background
All three proposals had been approved by a three-quarter majority in both houses of the Commonwealth Legislature.

Proposed changes

Chapter II, Articles 16 and 17
Chapter II, article 16 would be amended to read:

It also involved deleting Chapter II, article 17, section f.

Chapter III, article 20
Section b of Chapter III, article 20 would be amended to read:

Chapter IV
The proposed amendments to Chapter IV were intended to ensure that federal courts had a constitutional basis, and to clarify their powers and procedures.

References

1997 referendums
1997 in the Northern Mariana Islands
Constitutional referendums in the Northern Mariana Islands